The 2012 FEU Tamaraws men's basketball team represented Far Eastern University for the 75th UAAP men's college basketball tournament. The team finished fifth, with a win-loss record of 9-5.

Roster

Results

Awards received
Terrence Romeo - Mythical team

External links

FEU Tamaraws basketball seasons
Tam